Shailaja Salokhe is an Indian table tennis player. She was a top player in India.

In 1975 Commonwealth Table Tennis Championships, she and her teammates won a silver medal.

She is awarded with Arjun Puraskar.

Salokhe currently coaches young children for developing skills in table tennis.

References

External links
 ITTF DATABASE

Indian female table tennis players
Living people
Place of birth missing (living people)
Year of birth missing (living people)
20th-century Indian women
20th-century Indian people
Recipients of the Arjuna Award